Ali Bouali, known professionally as Ali B (born 16 October 1981), is a Dutch-Moroccan rapper. He is one of the most well known rappers in the Netherlands and he has performed together with Akon and Dutch artist Marco Borsato. In 2007 he made an Arab Remix of Akon's song "Ghetto."

He is seen as a prominent figure in Dutch inter-ethnic relations.  

Ali B is also known for his roles in television. In 2011 he was given his own television-show for broadcast on TROS -station; Ali B op volle toeren invites young rappers and (established) artists of other genres to make cover-versions of each other songs. In 2013, he served as a mentor on X Factor. From 2013 to 2022, Ali B served as a coach on The Voice of Holland (replacing Roel van Velzen) and The Voice Kids (replacing Nick & Simon). In 2020, he served as a judge on Holland's Got Talent. In 2016, Ali B released a single with long-time collaborator Brace and chart-topping reggae-artist Kenny B.

In 2017 he made his acting-debut in the Belgian movie Patser; the premiere was early 2018.

Personal life
He is married to Breghje Kommers, the half-sister of professional footballer Abel Tamata.

Sexual assault allegations
In January 2022, the Dutch Public Prosecution Service received reports against Ali B for sexually transgressive behaviour, and in one case rape. This took place while Ali B was working as a judge at The Voice of Holland. YouTube show BOOS episode 'This is the Voice' featured many allegations of sexual misconduct and even rape against Ali B. He has so far denied these allegations. In March 2023, it was announced that Ali B would be charged with three counts of sexual assault in response to the claims of sexually transgressive behavior directed at him.

Discography
 Albums 

 Singles Featured in'

Awards and nominations

References

External links 
  
 Ali B on 3voor12.vpro.nl 
 biography on popinstituut.nl 
 

1981 births
Living people
Dutch people of Moroccan descent
Dutch rappers
Moroccan rappers
People from Zaanstad